"Worrisome Heart" is a song written and composed by American jazz singer-songwriter Melody Gardot. It was released in as a promo single for her debut album of the same name.

Chart positions

External links

References

2008 singles
Melody Gardot songs
Songs written by Melody Gardot
2008 songs